This is the list of episodes for the Food Network competition reality series Chopped. New episodes are broadcast on Tuesdays at 9 p.m. ET.

Series overview
See the following pages for lists of episodes by season:

 Seasons 1–20
 Seasons 21–40
 Season 41 to present, plus specials

See also
List of Chopped: Canada episodes
List of Chopped Junior episodes
List of Chopped Sweets episodes

External links
 Chopped episode guide at FoodNetwork.com
 Chopped Junior episode guide at FoodNetwork.com

Lists of food television series episodes